Sir Thomas Lucy (1583/86 – 8 December 1640) of Charlecote Park, Warwickshire was an English politician who sat in the House of Commons at various times between 1614 and 1640.

Early life
Lucy was the eldest surviving son of Thomas Lucy of Charlecote Park and his wife Constance Kingsmill, the daughter of Sir Richard Kingsmill of High Clere, Hampshire. 

His grandfather Sir Thomas Lucy was an MP and is noted for prosecuting William Shakespeare although there is little evidence to support this claim.

Career
In 1614, Lucy was elected Member of Parliament for Warwickshire. He held the seat through several elections until 1629 when King Charles decided to rule without parliament. In April 1640, he was re-elected MP for Warwickshire in the Short Parliament. In November 1640 he was elected MP for Warwick in the Long Parliament but died in December.

Lucy died after falling from his horse and was buried at St Leonard's Church, Charlecote. It was said of him that "his tables were ever open to the learned and his gates never fast to the poor".

Family life
Lucy married Alice Spencer, daughter of Thomas Spencer of Claverden, Warwickshire. Alice was described as an archetypal gentlewoman, known for her charity and piety. They had twelve children, six sons and six daughters, including
 Sir Fulke Lucy
 Richard Lucy  
 Constance Lucy, who married firstly Sir William Spencer and secondly  Sir Edward Smith, Chief Justice of the Irish Common Pleas.

References

1580s births
1640 deaths
English MPs 1614
English MPs 1621–1622
English MPs 1624–1625
English MPs 1625
English MPs 1626
English MPs 1628–1629
English MPs 1640 (April)
English MPs 1640–1648